Magic is the third studio album by Tongan-American family band The Jets, released on September 27th, 1987, by MCA Records. It was the first album without Eugene Wolfgramm, who left the group to form Boys Club.

The album spawned multiple hit singles. "Cross My Broken Heart" also appeared on the soundtrack to Beverly Hills Cop II.

The album included their first US dance chart number 1 hit "Sendin' All My Love", as well as "Make It Real", which stayed at the top of the adult contemporary chart for 4 weeks and cracked the top five on the US pop chart, peaking at number 4. "Rocket 2 U" was also another hit from the album, reaching number 6 on the Hot 100.

The album reached number 35 in the U.S. It was certified Gold.

Critical reception
AllMusic wrote that the album "stands apart simply because, for all of its timeless appeal, it is remindful of youth without seeming juvenile—a formula few pop artists ever seem to master." The Christian Science Monitor thought that the band "work the same punchy dance grooves—but with an added touch of sophistication this time."

Track listing
"I Do You" – 3:37 (Linda Mallah, Rick Kelly)
"The Only Dance" – 4:35 (Tom Keane, Michael Himelstein)
"Believe It or Not, It's Magic" – 3:50 (Bernard Jackson, David Townsend, David Conley)
"Make It Real" – 4:11 (Linda Mallah, Rick Kelly, Don Powell)
"Rocket 2 U" – 4:17 (Bobby Nunn)
"Sendin' All My Love" – 3:30 (Linda Mallah, Stephen Bray)
"Anytime" – 3:50 (Rupert Holmes)
"When You're Young and in Love" – 4:25 (Van McCoy)
"First Time in Love" – 4:05 (Duncan Payne, Gerry Stober)
"Cross My Broken Heart" – 4:08 (Stephen Bray, Michael Verdick)

Singles released
"Cross My Broken Heart" – Pop number 7 / R&B number 11 / Dance number 8
"I Do You" – Pop number 20 / R&B number 19
"Rocket 2 U" – Pop number 6 / R&B number 5 / Dance number 3
"Make It Real" – Pop number 4 / R&B number 24 / AC number 1 / Year Ending (1988) 51
"Sendin' All My Love" – Pop number 88 / R&B number 72 / Dance number 1
"Anytime" – R&B number 98

References

1987 albums
The Jets (band) albums
MCA Records albums